Ryan Hampton is a writer and American political activist. He is known for his books about opioid addiction.

American Fix

In August 2018, Hampton published his first book, "American Fix: Inside the Opioid Addiction Crisis-and How to End It" - cowritten with Claire Rudy Foster, published by St. Martin's Press/Macmillan Publishing. In American Fix, Hampton writes with candor about his experiences with what he calls a broken treatment system and outlines a political agenda for combatting the nation's addiction crisis.

Hampton is a frequent contributor to The Huffington Post.

Political activism

Hampton has been a vocal opponent of President Donald Trump's border wall, arguing that Trump's immigration agenda is shifting focus backwards to a "War on Drugs" approach. He has advocated for safer recovery housing for addicts and for standards to end rogue sober homes in America.

In August 2018, Hampton led a 500-person protest against drugmaker Purdue Pharma for their role in the American opioid crisis. He has been at the forefront in calling for accountability from drug makers.

In January 2019, Hampton was the guest of U.S. House Democrats to President Trump's State of the Union speech, representing the addiction recovery advocacy movement.

In an effort to force the U.S. Food and Drug Administration to take action on the American addiction crisis, Hampton organized a rally in April 2019 and staged an 800-pound spoon at the headquarters of the U.S. Department of Health and Human Services.

Hampton has been called to testify before the U.S. Congress on numerous occasions and offer his experience and opinion on combating the opioid crisis in the United States.

References

External links
"Drug companies are paying hundreds of millions of dollars to settle opioid lawsuits. Spend it to treat addiction, experts say" from USA Today
"Inside the Fight for Regulation as Rehab Centers Cash in on Patients" from Variety
"No More About Us Without Us: A Conversation with Ryan Hampton" from LA Review of Books
"'American Fix' And The Path Out Of The Opioid Epidemic" from Forbes

Living people
Year of birth missing (living people)
American political activists
21st-century American male writers
Writers from Miami
Marymount University alumni
Writers from Pasadena, California
Writers on addiction